Pal Joey may refer to:
 Pal Joey (novel), a 1940 epistolary novel by John O'Hara
 Pal Joey (musical), a 1940 musical based on the novel
 Pal Joey (film), a 1957 film, loosely adapted from the musical of the same name
 Pal Joey (André Previn album), 1957
 Pal Joey (Kenny Drew album), 1959
 "Pal Joey" (Space Ghost Coast to Coast), a television episode